Jordan Kerby (born 15 August 1992) is an Australian-born New Zealand professional road and track cyclist, who currently rides for UCI Continental team . In 2017, he became UCI Track Cycling World Champion in the Men's individual pursuit in Hong Kong.

Kerby was part of the Australian team that took gold in the team pursuit at the 2018 Commonwealth Games on the Gold Coast. He subsequently switched allegiance to New Zealand and took gold in the same event at the 2022 Commonwealth Games in Birmingham.

Major results

Track

2009
 Australian Junior National Track Championships
1st  Team pursuit
3rd Points race
2010
 UCI Junior Track World Championships
1st  Team pursuit
1st  Points race
 Oceanian Track Championships
1st  Points race
3rd  Team pursuit
 1st  Points race, Australian Junior National Track Championships
2011
 2nd Team pursuit, Australian National Track Championships
2017
 1st  Individual pursuit, UCI Track World Championships
 Oceanian Track Championships
1st  Individual pursuit
1st  Team pursuit
2nd  Scratch
 Australian National Track Championships
1st  Individual pursuit
3rd Points race
3rd Scratch
2018
 1st  Team pursuit, Commonwealth Games
 Australian National Track Championships
1st  Individual pursuit
1st  Points race
 UCI World Cup
1st  Team pursuit, Cambridge
2019
 Oceanian Track Championships
1st  Scratch
2nd  Individual pursuit
3rd  Madison
 New Zealand National Track Championships
1st  Omnium
1st  Madison (with Campbell Stewart)
2nd Individual pursuit
2nd Points race
 UCI World Cup
2nd  Team pursuit, Brisbane
3rd  Team pursuit, Cambridge
2020
 1st  Scratch, New Zealand National Track Championships
 2nd Team pursuit, UCI Track World Championships
2022
 1st  Team pursuit, Commonwealth Games
 3rd  Individual pursuit, Oceanian Track Championships

Road

2012
 1st Prologue Tour of Thailand
 Oceania Road Championships
5th Under-23 road race
9th Road race
 10th Overall Tour of China II
2013
 1st  Road race, Australian National Under-23 Road Championships
 1st Prologue Herald Sun Tour
2014
 1st  Time trial, Australian National Under-23 Road Championships
 9th Chrono Champenois
2015
 Oceania Road Championships
2nd  Road race
7th Time trial
2017
 7th Overall New Zealand Cycle Classic
2018
 1st Stage 5 New Zealand Cycle Classic

References

External links

1992 births
Living people
Australian male cyclists
New Zealand male cyclists
UCI Track Cycling World Champions (men)
Cyclists at the 2018 Commonwealth Games
Commonwealth Games medallists in cycling
Commonwealth Games gold medallists for Australia
Australian track cyclists
New Zealand track cyclists
Olympic cyclists of New Zealand
Cyclists at the 2020 Summer Olympics
Cyclists at the 2022 Commonwealth Games
Commonwealth Games competitors for New Zealand
Commonwealth Games gold medallists for New Zealand
Medallists at the 2018 Commonwealth Games
Medallists at the 2022 Commonwealth Games